The fences in Saint Petersburg, Russia are highly varied, with many notable examples remaining in use today from different periods in Russian architectural history.

The works on the fences' creation began in the second half of 18th century (1770–1784) following the project of Yury Felten. The fencing consists of 36 granite columns, 32 links of shod fencings and the big gate in the centre and small ones on both sides. The gate are opposite the Summer garden avenues. Length of fencing is 232 metres. In 1866 there was an assassination against the Emperor Alexander II. In the memory of his rescue the chapel was constructed in place of the central gate. In 1930 a chapel was demolished, but the authentic image was lost.

Church of the Savior on Blood
The fencing at the Church of the Savior on Blood was created following the project of Alfred Alexandrovich Parland and executed in 1903-1907. This fencing has beautiful patterns formed by shod links with a large vegetative ornaments. It is characteristic for an early modernist style. The fencing stretches from Benua's wing on the embankment of the Griboyedov Canal to the Moyka river.

Ostrovsky Square
The fencing was established in 1837 simultaneously with the monument to the Empress Catherine II between the Nevsky Prospect and the Rossi Street. The fencing design is simple: its links fasten to cylindrical racks, and at the top of the fencing there are sharp peaks.

Anichkov Bridge

The fencing of the Anichkov Bridge was created after the drawings of German architect Karl Friedrich Schinkel. The bridge fencings are a copy of a handrail of the Schlossbrücke (Palace Bridge) in Berlin, which was constructed by Schinkel in 1822-1824. Fencing sections are located between pig-iron racks. On each side in the racks there are sections with two variants of design. On the one hand there are sea fads with a trident of Neptune and the mermaids on the other side.

Blagoveshchensky Bridge
The fencing of the Blagoveshchensky Bridge followed the Decorative style and was designed after U. Bryllov's project. Fencing links are decorated by tridents of Neptune and figures of the sea fads. Their tails are intertwined in a vegetative figured ornament. The internal space of racks of the bridge is filled by various figures.

Liteyny Bridge 
The fencing of the Liteyny Bridge is very graceful. The design follows the drawings of the architect K. Rahau. The bridge fencing has a quay ornament. Sections of a handrail are the cast. Their centre is decorated by a board with the city arms. There are crossed scepters and anchors which hold mermaids.

Bridge of Four Lions

The fencing of the Bridge of Four Lions was created in the 19th century, following the drawing of the engineer G. Tretter. The fencing consists of extended rhombuses, which join at the corners. Small flower sockets are placed inside of these connections.

External links

http://www.spbin.ru/encyclopedia/bridges/lviny.htmrch_ensemble/marsovo/fence
https://web.archive.org/web/20110722000821/http://www.ograda.spb.ru/resh.php?num=15
http://spbfoto.spb.ru/foto/details.php?image_id=129
http://www.opeterburge.ru/bridge_388.html
 :ru:Певческий мост
http://www.most-spb.ru/lyteyny/lyteyny_foto/liteyny_foto20.htm
http://fotki.yandex.ru/users/lebert/view/108848/
https://web.archive.org/web/20120303182622/http://www.tospb.ru/index.php?thisbridge=5
https://web.archive.org/web/20120114175745/http://osnova-stal.ru/ehto-interesno/ograda-skvera-na-pl-ostrovskogo.html
https://web.archive.org/web/20110212094154/http://gas-avto.com/chetvertoe_pokolenie

Fences